The Hanoi–Thai Nguyen Expressway is an expressway in Vietnam. It connects Hanoi with Thai Nguyen. The maximum speed is 100 km/h and the expressway has 4 lanes.

Development
Thai Nguyen is a major industrial center of the Red River Delta. The investment budget was a 10,000 billion VND, with about two thirds of that amount being Japanese development loans, the rest financed by the Vietnamese government.

Construction started in 2009 and was completed in 2014. In 2018 it was reported that several long sections of the road had severe rutting and subsidence, which had to be repaired the same year. In 2019, additional repairs for the same issue had to be carried out.

References

Expressways in Vietnam